Chad holds elections on national level for a head of state – the president –  and a legislature. The president is elected for a five-year term by the people. The National Assembly (Assemblée Nationale) has 155 members, elected for a four-year term in 25 single-member constituencies and 34 multi-member constituencies.
Chad is a one party dominant state with the Patriotic Salvation Movement in power, although according to the African Union,  elections in Chad are generally free and fair. Human Rights Watch, however, has criticized the election process in Chad, arguing that they have problems such as electoral fraud, multiple voting, underage voting, and low voter turnout.

History of elections 
Former president, Idriss Déby, seized power in 1990 through a rebellion. The second election of Déby was reported by international observers to be fraudulent. In 1997, parliamentary elections were held, with the MPS party of Déby winning 63 of the 125 seats existing at the time. International observers also claimed that these elections witnessed serious irregularities. In May 2001, Déby won the presidential election in the first round with 63% of the vote, but the election was considered to be fraudulent, and several opposition leaders were arrested after accusing the Chadian government of election fraud. Because of prominent electoral irregularities in the previous elections in 2001 and 2006, the 2011 presidential election was boycotted by the major opposition parties, which resulted in Déby winning 89% of the vote in the first round. Most recently, Déby was elected to his fifth term in 2016, after abolishing presidential term limits in 2004 by amending the Constitution of Chad.
Most recently,  Kodi Mahamat Bam, President of the Independent National Electoral Commission announced the postponement of legislative elections to April 2021. The stated reason was related to COVID-19.

Latest elections

Presidential elections

Parliamentary elections

References

External links
Adam Carr's Election Archive
African Elections Database